The Bagvalal (also called Bagulal, Kwantl Hekwa, Bagolal, Kwanadi, Bagulaltsy, Kvanadin, and Kvanadintsy) are an Avar–Andi–Dido people of Dagestan, speaking the Bagvalal language. Since the 1930s they have been largely classed as and assimilated by the Avars. However there were still some people reported separately in the 2002 census. The Bagvalals are Sunni Muslims.

Geography
The Bagvalal live in mountain villages in the Tsumadinsky District of Dagestan. The names of the Bagvalal villages are: Kvanada, Gimerso, Tlisi, Tlibisho, Khushtada, and Tlondada.

Demographics
In 1926 there were 3,054 Bagvalals.

References

Sources
Wixman, Ronald.  The Peoples of the USSR: An Ethnographic Handbook. (Armonk, New York: M. E. Sharpe, Inc., 1984) p. 19.

Peoples of the Caucasus
Ethnic groups in Dagestan
Muslim communities of Russia
Muslim communities of the Caucasus